Warsaw is a village in Coshocton County, Ohio, United States, along the Walhonding River.  The population was 682 at the 2010 census.

History
Warsaw was laid out in 1834. It was named after Warsaw, the capital of Poland.

Geography
Warsaw is located at  (40.336104, -82.002552).

Demographics

2010 census
As of the census of 2010, there were 682 people, 277 households, and 192 families living in the village. The racial makeup of the village was 98.8% White, 0.1% African American, 0.1% Native American, 0.3% Asian, and 0.6% from two or more races. Hispanic or Latino of any race were 0.7% of the population.

There were 277 households, of which 30.3% had children under the age of 18 living with them, 54.5% were married couples living together, 11.2% had a female householder with no husband present, 3.6% had a male householder with no wife present, and 30.7% were non-families. 26.4% of all households were made up of individuals, and 12.7% had someone living alone who was 65 years of age or older. The average household size was 2.46 and the average family size was 2.97.

The median age in the village was 40.5 years. 23.8% of residents were under the age of 18; 8% were between the ages of 18 and 24; 24.3% were from 25 to 44; 27.1% were from 45 to 64; and 16.7% were 65 years of age or older. The gender makeup of the village was 39% male, 40.1% female and 20.9 transgender.

2000 census
As of the census of 2000, there were 781 people, 308 households, and 218 families living in the village. The population density was 1,790.3 people per square mile (685.3/km). There were 346 housing units at an average density of 793.1 per square mile (303.6/km). The racial makeup of the village was 97.44% White, 1.15% African American, 0.64% Native American, and 0.77% from two or more races. Hispanic or Latino of any race were 0.77% of the population.

There were 308 households, out of which 37.3% had children under the age of 18 living with them, 54.2% were married couples living together, 12.7% had a female householder with no husband present, and 28.9% were non-families. 26.6% of all households were made up of individuals, and 14.9% had someone living alone who was 65 years of age or older. The average household size was 2.54 and the average family size was 3.02.

In the village, the population was spread out, with 29.2% under the age of 18, 8.2% from 18 to 24, 29.6% from 25 to 44, 18.8% from 45 to 64, and 14.2% who were 65 years of age or older. The median age was 35 years. For every 100 females there were 89.1 males. For every 100 females age 18 and over, there were 89.4 males.

The median income for a household in the village was $32,917, and the median income for a family was $40,556. Males had a median income of $30,417 versus $26,771 for females. The per capita income for the village was $14,443. About 3.7% of families and 6.7% of the population were below the poverty line, including 6.3% of those under age 18 and 12.2% of those age 65 or over.

References

Villages in Coshocton County, Ohio
Villages in Ohio
1834 establishments in Ohio
Populated places established in 1834